Swellhead is a 1935 American comedy drama film directed by Benjamin Stoloff and starring Wallace Ford, Dickie Moore and Barbara Kent.

Synopsis
A cocky baseball player is forever bragging about his success on the field, and off it with woman. However after he suffers in an accident, his luck seems to have turned against him.

Cast
 Wallace Ford as Terry McCall
 Dickie Moore as Billy Malone
 Barbara Kent as Mary Malone
 J. Farrell MacDonald as Umpire
 Marion Byron as Bessie
 Sammy Cohen as Casey Cohen
 Mike Donlin as Brick Baldwin
 Frank Moran as The Rube
 Bryant Washburn as Malone

References

Bibliography
 Dick, Bernard F. Columbia Pictures: Portrait of a Studio. University Press of Kentucky, 2015.

External links
 

1935 films
1935 drama films
American drama films
Films directed by Benjamin Stoloff
Columbia Pictures films
1930s English-language films
1930s American films